Tibor Oross (1961 – 1998) was a Hungarian handball player. He participated at the 1988 Summer Olympics, where the Hungarian national team placed fourth.

References

1959 births
1998 deaths
Sportspeople from Győr
Hungarian male handball players
Olympic handball players of Hungary
Handball players at the 1988 Summer Olympics